Events from the year 1954 in Scotland.

Incumbents 

 Secretary of State for Scotland and Keeper of the Great Seal – James Stuart

Law officers 
 Lord Advocate – James Latham Clyde
 Solicitor General for Scotland – William Rankine Milligan

Judiciary 
 Lord President of the Court of Session and Lord Justice General – Lord Cooper until 23 December; then Lord Clyde
 Lord Justice Clerk – Lord Thomson
 Chairman of the Scottish Land Court – Lord Gibson

Events 
 28 January – John Thomas Wheatley appointed as a Senator of the College of Justice.
 12 February – United Kingdom Atomic Energy Authority founded; the body in this same year will decide on Dounreay as a 'safe' site for its fast breeder reactor tests.
 17 February – RMS Saxonia is launched at John Brown & Company's shipyard on Clydebank for the Cunard Line's Canadian service.
 March – Scottish Journal of Political Economy first published.
 16 March – major fire damages Skerryvore lighthouse.
 27 April – Clyde F.C. beat Celtic 1 – 0 in the replayed final of the Scottish Cup.
 12 May – work on construction of Seafield Colliery at Kirkcaldy begins.
 4 July – fourteen years of rationing during and following World War II comes to an end when meat officially comes off ration.
 July – work on construction of Ravenscraig steelworks is authorized.
 19 July – United Kingdom Atomic Energy Authority established by the Atomic Energy Act "to produce, use and dispose of atomic energy and carry out research into any matters therewith".
 3 September – the National Trust for Scotland acquires Fair Isle from George Waterston.
 23 October – Heart of Midlothian F.C. beats Motherwell 4–2 to win the Scottish League Cup.
 23 November – opening of Walsh trial, to determine whether Douglas Walsh of Dumbarton, a Jehovah's Witness pioneer, has the same right as an ordained religious minister in Scotland to be exempted from conscripted military service.
 25 December – 1954 Prestwick air disaster: BOAC Boeing 377 Stratocruiser G-ALSA crashes on landing at Prestwick Airport from London in poor visibility, killing 28.
 Asymmetric footbridge over Gala Water in Galashiels opened.
 Osprey recolonize Scotland.

Births 
 5 January – Myra Nimmo, long jumper
 15 February – John McAslan, architect
 16 February – Iain Banks, novelist (died 2013)
 8 March – David Wilkie, swimmer (born in Colombo)
 9 March – Jim Stewart, footballer
 14 March – David Taylor, football administrator, joint General Secretary of UEFA
 23 March – Mary Fee, Labour Party politician
 9 April – Iain Duncan Smith, Conservative Party leader, MP and government minister
 28 April – Tom McCabe, Labour Party politician, MSP (1999–2011) and government minister (died 2015)
 5 May – Brian Souter, businessman and founder of Stagecoach Group
 28 June – A. A. Gill, newspaper critic (died 2016 in London)
 2 August – Ken MacLeod, science fiction writer
 5 August – Allan Wilson, Labour Party politician, MSP (1999–2007)
 16 August – George Galloway, politician, founder of the Respect Party
 26 August – David Martin, Labour Party politician, Member of the European Parliament for Scotland
 11 September – Ian Anderson, footballer (died 2008)
 28 September – Mike McCartney, footballer
 16 October – Michael Forsyth, Baron Forsyth of Drumlean, Conservative Secretary of State for Scotland
 19 October – Ken Stott, actor
 16 November – Donald Runnicles, orchestral conductor
 25 December – Annie Lennox, singer-songwriter, political activist and philanthropist
 27 December – Joanna Strathdee, Scottish National Party politician (died 2015)
 31 December – Alex Salmond, Scottish National Party First Minister of Scotland (2007–14)
 George McGavin, entomologist

Deaths 
 11 February – Alexander Anderson, Labour Party politician and Member of Parliament 1947–54 (born 1888)
 18 April – Helen Crawfurd, suffragette and communist activist (born 1877)
 6 May – B. C. Forbes, financial journalist and author who founded Forbes Magazine in the United States (born 1880)
 18 July – Thomas S. Tait, architect (born 1882)
 12 November – Alex Smith, international footballer (born 1876)
 22 November – Jimmy Gordon, footballer (born 1888)

The arts
 George Mackay Brown's first book of poetry, The Storm, is published.
 Sorley MacLean's Scottish Gaelic poetry Hallaig is published in Gairm.
 Roddy McMillan's play All in Good Faith is presented at the Citizens Theatre, Glasgow.
 American photographer Paul Strand works in the Outer Hebrides.
 Alexander Trocchi's novel Young Adam is published.

See also 
 1954 in Northern Ireland

References 

 
Scotland
Years of the 20th century in Scotland
1950s in Scotland